Santi Ippolito e Cassiano may refer to:

 Santi Ippolito e Cassiano, San Casciano, a village in Cascina, Tuscany, Italy
 Santi Ippolito e Cassiano, Caprese Michelangelo, a church and former pieve in San Cassiano in Stratino, Caprese Michelangelo, Tuscany, Italy

See also
 Sant'Ippolito (disambiguation)